Ranadive is a surname. Notable people with the surname include:

 Anjali Ranadivé
 B. T. Ranadive (1904–1990), Indian communist politician and trade union leader
 Kamal Ranadive (1917–2001), Indian biomedical researcher
 Vivek Ranadivé (born 1957), Indian American business executive, engineer, author, speaker and philanthropist